A Nicer Shade of Red is a compilation album by the Rollins Band. It was recorded at the same sessions that produced Nice, making it a companion piece to that album, and was released directly by Rollins' 2.13.61 label. The album features four songs that only appeared on vinyl or foreign CD releases of Nice as well as an extended mix of "Your Number Is One" and a cover of The Dead Boys' "Ain't It Fun".

Track listing
 "Too Much Rock and Roll" (3:50)
 "Marcus Has The Evil in Him" (4:01)
 "Nowhere To Go But Inside" (3:04)
 "10X" (3:04)
 "Always the Same" (2:57)
 "Soul Implant" (1:56)
 "Raped" (4:57)
 "Ain't It Fun" (Peter Laughner, Cheetah Chrome) (3:43)
 "You Lost Me" (5:47)
 "Stone Washed Clean" (4:18)
 "A Life Denied" (3:25)
 "Your Number Is One" (long version) (4:37)
 "Such a Drag" (12:55)
All songs written and composed by Henry Rollins, Jim Wilson, Marcus Blake and Jason Mackenroth and published by Be Drinkable Music (BMI)/MS Catalog (ASCAP) except where noted.

Personnel
Rollins Band
Henry Rollins – vocals (credited as "throat")
Jim Wilson – guitar, piano
Marcus Blake – bass
Jason Mackenroth – drums
with:
Mike Curtis – road manager (also credited with "knower of many things and whatnot")
Darrell Bussino – FOH sound (also credited with "The Way. Justice.")
Kerim Imes – percussion on "Your Number Is One (long version)"

Production Personnel
Henry Rollins – producer
Clif Norrell – recording and mixing engineer
Mike Curtis – "great guitar sounds" (i.e. helping produce and record the guitar tracks)
Stephen Marcussen – mastering
Sander De Jong – assistant recording engineer
Chris Reynolds – assistant mixing engineer (Sunset Sound Recorders)
Paul Smith – assistant mixing engineer (Skip Saylor Recording)

Studios
Cherokee Studios – tracking
Sunset Sound Recorders – mixing
Skip Saylor Recording – mixing

References

Rollins Band albums
2001 compilation albums
2.13.61 compilation albums